Kalisi Naduddam is a 2001 Indian Telugu-language romantic drama film directed by Kodi Ramakrishna. The film stars Srikanth and Soundarya. It features music composed by S. A. Rajkumar. The plot follows relationship between Krishna and Vijaya, a married couple with opposing ideologies.

Kalisi Naduddam was released theatrically on 29 June 2001.

Plot
Krishna is a government employee who is not satisfied with his meagre salary. He is married to Vijaya, a progressive woman who is devoted to her husband, in an arranged marriage. In order to earn money quickly, he leaves his job and invests the dowry received from his wife Vijaya and her jewellery in the real estate and prawns business. Vijaya is against this and firmly believes that a job which offers a fixed salary is much better than such risky business plans. Krishna, however, remains unbudged and challenges himself to leave her should he lose her money in business. Afraid of Krishna's attitude, Vijaya resolves to bring a change in her husband.

As expected, Krishna suffers losses due to his reckless attitude while Vijaya gradually sees success in her and becomes an inspiration for the fellow women in her neighbourhood. Vijaya is honoured for her work toward the empowerment of women. Krishna realizes his misdeeds and apologizes to Vijaya on stage.

Cast 
Srikanth as Krishna
Soundarya as Vijaya
Sudhakar
Brahmanandam
M. S. Narayana
Mallikarjuna Rao
L. B. Sriram
Sri Lakshmi
Rama Prabha
Jr. Relangi
Alphonsa
Suma Kanakala

Production
Filming began on 3 February 2001. Srikanth and Soundarya both worked on this film and another film titled Manasista Raa.

Soundtrack 
Music by S. A. Rajkumar.
"Okka Sari Krindiki" – Sujatha, Hariharan
"Kanchare Kanchare" – Sujatha, Hariharan
"Yenati Sarasami" – K. S. Chitra
"Jil Jil Jil Jil" – Swarnalatha, Mano
"Atu Itu Chudake" – S. P. Balasubrahmanyam, K. S. Chitra

Reception 
Writing for Zamin Ryot, Griddaluru Gopalrao gave a positive review for the film. He appreciated Kodi Ramakrishna for bringing novelty in screenplay and direction while praising the performances of Srikanth and Soundarya as a married couple. Bhargav Shastry of Full Hyderabad wrote that "Every alternate scene in the film is a glaringly irritating comic scene, and that kills the tempo. Incongruously placed songs sans melody irk you every now and then. Srikant's character as the arrogant MCP gets on your nerves. Soundarya, though, gives a very good performance as we've grown to expect from her". In a more mixed review, Filmibeat Jalapathy stated that the film was let down by poor direction and mediocre performances.

References

External links